Cameron Talbot (born July 5, 1987) is a Canadian professional ice hockey goaltender for the Ottawa Senators of the National Hockey League (NHL). He had also played for the New York Rangers, the Edmonton Oilers, the Calgary Flames, the Philadelphia Flyers, and the Minnesota Wild.

Prior to joining the NHL, Talbot played at the University of Alabama in Huntsville, where he was named an All-College Hockey America Second Team and MVP in the 2010 CHA tournament. Internationally, Talbot has represented Canada at the 2016 IIHF World Championship.

Playing career

Amateur
Cam Talbot grew up in Caledonia, Ontario, and started playing with the Caledonia Thunder MHA programs before making the leap to the Hamilton Jr. Bulldogs of the South Central AAA League in Minor Bantam. He played three seasons of AAA hockey, was undrafted in the 2003 OHL Priority Selection and returned to the Jr. Bulldogs, where he played a season of Major Midget.

After a solid Major Midget season, Talbot made the Hamilton Red Wings of the Ontario Junior Hockey League (OJHL) for the 2004–05 season.

Talbot played college hockey at the University of Alabama in Huntsville. In the 2009–10 season, he was named to the All-College Hockey America Second Team and was named Most Valuable Player in the CHA Tournament, while leading the Chargers to a berth in the NCAA Tournament.

Professional

New York Rangers
On March 30, 2010, the NHL's New York Rangers signed Talbot as a free agent. He was promoted to the Rangers on February 28, 2011, after playing the majority of the 2010–11 season with the Connecticut Whale of the American Hockey League (AHL) (he also played two ECHL games with the Greenville Road Warriors) and was returned to the Whale on March 3, 2011.

Talbot played the 2011–12 season with Connecticut, but after Connecticut was eliminated from the AHL playoffs, Talbot was added to the Rangers' Stanley Cup playoff roster. After the 2012–13 Whale season, he was again added to the Rangers' playoff roster. Talbot was again called up to the Rangers on October 15, 2013, after Martin Biron was demoted to the AHL, finding himself a place in the NHL for the first time as the backup to starter Henrik Lundqvist. Talbot made his on-ice NHL debut on October 24 in a 2–1 loss to the Philadelphia Flyers. His first NHL win came in his next game, against the Detroit Red Wings, on October 26, 2013, and he earned his first NHL shutout against the Montreal Canadiens on November 16, 2013. In the 2014 playoffs, Talbot twice entered to relieve Lundqvist en route to the Rangers' Eastern Conference title before ultimately falling to the Los Angeles Kings in the Finals.

For the 2014–15 season, Talbot began the year as the Rangers' backup goaltender, and in his first eight games played, he recorded three shutouts, matching his total from the entire previous season.

On February 3, 2015, Talbot became New York's temporary starting goaltender after Henrik Lundqvist suffered a ruptured blood vessel in his neck. Talbot started 24 of the Rangers' next 26 games (Mackenzie Skapski played the other two) until March 27, when Lundqvist returned to the line-up. During Lundqvist's absence, Talbot performed better in net and went 17–4–3. In fact, Talbot ended the season with a lower GAA (2.21), and a higher save percentage (.926) than Lundqvist (2.25 GAA, .922 save percentage). For his remarkable efforts towards New York's Presidents' Trophy-winning season, he received the Steve McDonald Extra Effort Award on April 6.

Edmonton Oilers
On June 27, 2015, Talbot was traded by the Rangers to the Edmonton Oilers in exchange for three draft picks in the 2015 NHL Entry Draft. Talbot competed for Edmonton's #1 goaltender spot with Anders Nilsson during his first season with the Oilers. On January 17, 2016, the Oilers signed Talbot to a three-year, $12 million contract extension. Nilsson was eventually traded to the St. Louis Blues, leaving Cam Talbot as Edmonton's starting goaltender. On April 6, 2017, Talbot set an Oilers record for most wins in a season passing Grant Fuhr, who had 40 wins, by earning 41 wins. Talbot finished the season by leading the NHL in games played (72 of 82 in regular season) and time on ice by a goaltender, as well as tied for first in wins with 42. The Oilers finished that season second in the Pacific Division, with 103 points. Talbot helped the Oilers reach Game 7 of the Western Semifinals, losing to the Anaheim Ducks in what was the first playoff appearance by the Oilers in ten years. Talbot finished the playoffs with a 2.88 GAA, .924 save percentage and two shutouts.

On October 4, 2017, Talbot recorded a 27-save shutout in the 2017–18 season-opener against the Calgary Flames. Talbot and the Oilers would not be able to replicate the previous season's success, and missed the playoffs. Talbot finished the season with a 31–31–3 record with a goals-against-average of 3.02. By 2018–19, his play had dipped again and he had been surpassed by Mikko Koskinen in the Oilers net.

Philadelphia Flyers
On February 15, 2019, Talbot was traded by the Oilers to the Philadelphia Flyers in exchange for goaltender Anthony Stolarz. Talbot had to waive his no-movement contract clause in order to be traded to the Flyers. Philadelphia acquired him to be both competition and a mentor to young goaltender Carter Hart and to replace Brian Elliott as backup. However, his numbers did not improve with Philadelphia, which was one of the worst teams in terms of goals against.

Calgary Flames
On July 1, 2019, having left the Flyers as a free agent, Talbot was signed to a one-year, $2.75 million deal with the Calgary Flames. On February 1, 2020, Talbot fought fellow goalie Mike Smith during a Battle of Alberta game. During the COVID-19 pandemic and the NHL's return to play, Talbot backstopped the Flames to a 3–1 series win over the Winnipeg Jets including a game four shutout of the Jets, earning Talbot the nickname "Yes We Cam" Talbot.

Minnesota Wild
On October 9, 2020, the opening day of free agency, Talbot left the Flames and agreed to a three-year deal worth $11 million to become the starting goaltender for the Minnesota Wild. He recorded a 19–8–5 record during the regular season in his first campaign with the Wild, leading them to a playoff spot. However, the Wild were eliminated in the first round of the 2021 playoffs by the Vegas Golden Knights. Talbot and young backup Kaapo Kähkönen played most of the 2021–22 season as the goalie tandem in Minnesota. However, the Wild traded out Kähkönen and acquired goaltender Marc-André Fleury at the trade deadline to improve their depth in goal.  The Wild played Fleury through most of the first round playoff loss to the St. Louis Blues. Fleury, a pending free agent, re-signed with Minnesota in the off-season which allowed Wild general manager Bill Guerin to make Talbot available for trade despite stating that he intended to keep Talbot.

Ottawa Senators
On July 12, 2022, with a year remaining on his contract, Talbot was traded by the Wild to the Ottawa Senators in exchange for Filip Gustavsson.

Personal life
Talbot married his wife Kelly in 2011, and the two had twins in October 2016.

Dating back to his time with the New York Rangers, Talbot has worn masks bearing characters and imagery from the Ghostbusters movies, painted by artist David Gunnarsson. This design also developed the goaltender's identity into being known as "Goalbuster."'

International play

Talbot attended the 2016 IIHF World Championship as the starting goaltender for Team Canada. He led the team to its second straight gold medal at the tournament and tied a tournament record for shutouts with 4.

Records

Edmonton Oilers
 Most wins in a season: 42 (2016–17)

Career statistics

Regular season and playoffs

International

Awards and honours

References

External links

1987 births
Living people
Alabama–Huntsville Chargers men's ice hockey players
Canadian expatriate ice hockey players in the United States
Canadian ice hockey goaltenders
Connecticut Whale (AHL) players
Edmonton Oilers players
Greenville Road Warriors players
Hartford Wolf Pack players
Ice hockey people from Ontario
Minnesota Wild players
New York Rangers players
Ottawa Senators players
Philadelphia Flyers players
Sportspeople from Haldimand County
Undrafted National Hockey League players